Pokrytie (  ҇  ) is one of the historic diacritical signs of Cyrillic that was used in Old Church Slavonic, later medieval Cyrillic literary traditions and modern Church Slavonic.

It is a modification of titlo adapted for covering (hence its name, Old Slavonic for 'covering') combining Cyrillic letters (so called letter-titlos). It is conventionally not used with combining modifications of letters Д, Ж, З and Х, although exceptions happen, especially in  skoropis.

The character was introduced into Unicode 5.1 in April 2008.

See also 
Old Church Slavonic
Cyrillic characters in Unicode

External links 
 

Cyrillic-script diacritics
Old Church Slavonic language